Mycovellosiella concors is a fungal plant pathogen infecting potatoes.

References

External links 
 Index Fungorum
 USDA ARS Fungal Database

Fungal plant pathogens and diseases
Potato diseases
Mycosphaerellaceae
Fungi described in 1974